Sugar Pine is an unincorporated community in Madera County, California. It is located 1 mile east of California State Route 41, between Oakhurst, California and the South Entrance of Yosemite National Park.

Sugar Pine was built by the Madera Sugar Pine Company in 1899 to 1900. The company which had an extensive logging operation in the area between the 1890s and 1931.  The mill pond and some service buildings are all that remain of the mill.  The company housing units, over the years updated, are still in use today as residences and vacation homes.

A post office operated at Sugar Pine from 1907 to 1934.

Gallery

References

Unincorporated communities in Madera County, California
Populated places in the Sierra Nevada (United States)
Populated places established in 1899
1899 establishments in California
Unincorporated communities in California